Gary Jones (born 4 January 1958) is a British-born Canadian actor, who has worked on television and on stage both in his native United Kingdom and Canada. He is known for his recurring role as CM Sgt. Walter Harriman in Stargate SG-1 and Stargate Atlantis. He has also made guest appearances on such shows as Sliders, Cold Squad, The Outer Limits, Andromeda and Dead Like Me.

Gary Jones was a member of the improv group "Mission Improvable", which had a CBC comedy special, before his role on Stargate SG-1. He joined Toronto's Second City Improv Company in the mid-1980s.

In 1986, with Second City he went to Vancouver for Expo 86, where they performed for six months at the Expo's Flying Club. After the Expo was finished, Jones stayed in Vancouver, and started his acting career with guest appearances in TV shows such as Wiseguy, Airwolf and Dangerbay. He was also a player of the Vancouver TheatreSports League.

Gary Jones is known not only for acting on screen and stage but also for hosting events, including several Leo Awards galas and the BCSS Emerald Eve gala.

Filmography

References

External links

1958 births
British male television actors
Male actors from Swansea
British expatriates in Canada
Living people
Canadian people of Welsh descent
20th-century Canadian male actors
21st-century Canadian male actors
20th-century Welsh male actors
21st-century Welsh male actors